Guillermo Salinas (born 27 January 1938) is a Chilean boxer. He competed in the men's middleweight event at the 1964 Summer Olympics.

References

External links
 

1938 births
Living people
Chilean male boxers
Olympic boxers of Chile
Boxers at the 1964 Summer Olympics
Place of birth missing (living people)
Middleweight boxers
20th-century Chilean people